Long Akah Airport  is an airport serving Long Akah in Sarawak, Malaysia.

Airlines and destinations

See also

 List of airports in Malaysia

References

External links
Short Take-Off and Landing Airports (STOL) at Malaysia Airports Holdings Berhad

Airports in Sarawak
Telang Usan District